Mehmet Alp Kurt (born 9 January 1996) is a German-Turkish footballer who plays as a defensive midfielder for Turkish club Şanlıurfaspor.

References

1996 births
German people of Turkish descent
Sportspeople from Hagen
Footballers from North Rhine-Westphalia
Living people
German footballers
Association football midfielders
Lüneburger SK Hansa players
Sportfreunde Siegen players
SC Verl players
1. FC Kaan-Marienborn players
SV Wehen Wiesbaden players
Şanlıurfaspor footballers
Regionalliga players
3. Liga players
TFF Second League players
German expatriate footballers
Expatriate footballers in Turkey
German expatriate sportspeople in Turkey